Liniscus is a genus of nematodes belonging to the family Capillariidae.

The species of this genus are found in America.

Species:

Liniscus diazae 
Liniscus incrassatus 
Liniscus papillosus 
Liniscus sunci

References

Nematodes